Jambudvipa, philosophical region in Indian religions
 Jambudweep, Digambara Jain temple in Hastinapur, Uttar Pradesh
 Jambudwip, Bay of Bengal